The Anglican Province of Niger Delta is one of the 14 ecclesiastical provinces of the Church of Nigeria. It comprises 13 dioceses. The Archbishop of the Anglican Province of Niger Delta and Bishop of Calabar is Tunde Adeleye.

It has 13 dioceses (2021):

Ahoada (Bishop: Clement Ekpeye)
Calabar (Bishop:Tunde Adeleye)
Etche (Bishop: Precious Nwala)
Evo (Bishop: Innocent Ordu)
Niger Delta (Bishop: Ralph Ebirien)
Ikwerre (Bishop: Blessing Enyindah)
Niger Delta West (Bishop: Emmanuel Oko-Jaja)
Niger Delta North (Bishop: Wisdom Budu Ihunwo)
Northern Izon (Bishop: Funkuro Godrules Ambare)
Ogbia (Bishop: James Oruwori)
Ogoni (Bishop: Solomon Gbregbara)
Okrika (Bishop: Tubokosemie Abere)
Uyo (Bishop: Prince Asukwo Antai)

Blessing Enyindah became Archbishop of Niger Delta Province on July 11, 2021.

References

Church of Nigeria ecclesiastical provinces